Thirteen Revisited is a 1987 anthology series presented by WNET in celebration of its silver anniversary. Each program is a repeat of an older WNET-produced program from the '60s and the '70s, with a select few from the '80s.

Programs
 September 16, 1987: The Great American Dream Machine: "Highlights Part 6" (originally broadcast September 18, 1974), NET Playhouse: "Ten Blocks on the Camino Real" (originally broadcast October 6, 1966), and Soul!: "Wonder Love" (originally broadcast November 19, 1972)
 September 20, 1987: TV Lab: "The Lathe of Heaven" (originally broadcast January 9, 1980)
 September 27, 1987: Bill Moyers Journal: "An Essay on Watergate" (originally broadcast October 31, 1973)
 October 4, 1987: Fanfare: "Gertrude Stein: When This You See, Remember Me" (originally broadcast December 20, 1970)
 October 11, 1987: NET Playhouse: "Let Me Hear You Whisper" (originally broadcast May 22, 1969)
 October 18, 1987: Public Broadcasting Laboratory: "Law and Order" (originally broadcast March 2, 1969)
 November 8, 1987: Theater in America: "Feasting with Panthers" (originally broadcast March 27, 1974)
 November 22, 1987: NET Journal: "What Harvest for the Reaper?" (originally broadcast February 5, 1968) and "Who Invited Us?" (originally broadcast February 16, 1970)
 November 29, 1987: NET Playhouse Biography: "Lorraine Hansbury: To Be Young, Gifted and Black" (originally broadcast January 20, 1972)
 December 6, 1987: Nature: "Forest in the Clouds" (originally broadcast November 21, 1982)
 December 20, 1987: Great Performances: Live from Lincoln Center: "Juilliard at 80" (originally broadcast October 5, 1985)
 December 27, 1987: Fanfare: "Welcome to the Fillmore East" (originally broadcast October 11, 1970)

References

Television series by WNET
1987 American television series debuts
1987 American television series endings
1980s American anthology television series
English-language television shows